The list of ship launches in 1882 includes a chronological list of some ships launched in 1882.


References

Sources

1882
 
1882 in transport